7-Methylindole is a mildly toxic off-white crystalline organic compound with chemical formula .

Preparation 
7-Methylindole can be prepared from 2,6-dimethylformanilide by reaction with potassium ethoxide.

Uses 
7-Methylindole is used in the production of agricultural chemicals and pharmaceuticals.

See also 

 Indole
 Methyl
 1-Methylindole
 2-Methylindole (methylketol)
 5-Methylindole
 Skatole (3-methylindole)

References 

Methylindoles